(Italian: "spun paste") is a technique in the manufacture of a family of Italian cheeses also known in English as stretched-curd, pulled-curd, and plastic-curd cheeses. Stretched curd cheeses manufactured from the pasta filata technique undergo a plasticising and kneading treatment of the fresh curd in hot water, which gives the cheese its fibrous structure.

The cheese-making begins in the normal way. The milk (usually from cows or water buffalo) is warmed and curdled and allowed to rest for an hour before the curds are cut into small pieces and the whey is drained off. The curds are allowed to rest for a number of hours. Once they begin to float, most of the liquid is removed and the curd is mixed and kneaded until the required soft, elastic, stringy texture is obtained. The mass of curd is divided (often by pulling out a thick strand and chopping it) and shaped into individual cheeses. In the case of mozzarella, the process is now essentially complete–ideally these cheeses should be eaten within a few days. 

See also

References

Italian cheeses
Stretched-curd cheeses